Schizocarphus is a monotypic genus of bulbous flowering plants in the family Asparagaceae, subfamily Scilloideae (also treated as the family Hyacinthaceae). The sole species Schizocarphus nervosus is found in Africa, from Tanzania south to South Africa.

References

Monotypic Asparagaceae genera
Scilloideae
Flora of Africa